Heidelberg Town Hall is a civic building located on Upper Heidelberg Road in Ivanhoe, a suburb of Melbourne, Australia. It is now more commonly known as The Centre Ivanhoe

Opened in April 1937, the building was designed by architectural firm Peck & Kemter in association with A.C. Leith & Bartlett for the Heidelberg City Council (now Banyule City Council) and was influenced by the Hilversum Town Hall in the Netherlands. It listed on the Victorian Heritage Register, described as "the greatest and most eloquent expression of the interwar brick Moderne style in Victoria." The architects were awarded the Royal Victorian Institute of Architects Victorian Street Architecture Medal for 1939 for the building.

The ’Berg 
Not long after the town hall opened the council engaged Bill Glennon to organise public dances on Wednesday and Saturday nights. An 18-piece dance band played in the Great Hall, two smaller downstairs rooms– the Streeton and Condor rooms has separate dances each featuring different music styles. The Streeton room featured “old-time’ music and the Condor Room, Jazz.

Free buses brought patrons from Melbourne’s Northern suburbs. The dances were hugely popular, over 2000 people would attend on a Saturday night.  Many locals recount meeting their spouses at the ’Berg.

The dances continued until the 1970’s.

See also
 List of Town Halls in Melbourne

References

External links
Official website

Town halls in Melbourne
Heritage-listed buildings in Melbourne
Buildings and structures in the City of Banyule
Art Deco architecture in Melbourne
1937 establishments in Australia
Heidelberg, Victoria
Government buildings completed in 1937
Clock towers in Australia